William John Simmons III (born September 25, 1969) is an American sports writer who is the founder and CEO of the sports and pop culture website The Ringer. Simmons first gained attention with his website as "The Boston Sports Guy" and was recruited by ESPN in 2001, where he eventually operated the website Grantland and worked until 2015. At ESPN, he wrote for ESPN.com, hosted his own podcast on ESPN.com titled The B.S. Report, and was an analyst for two years on NBA Countdown.

Simmons founded The Ringer, a sports and pop culture website and podcast network, in 2016 and serves as its CEO. 
He hosted Any Given Wednesday with Bill Simmons on HBO for one season in 2016.  At The Ringer, he hosts The Bill Simmons Podcast. Simmons is known for a style of writing characterized by mixing sports knowledge and analysis, pop culture references, his non-sports-related personal life, and for being written from the viewpoint of a passionate sports fan.

Early life
Simmons was born on September 25, 1969, to William Simmons and Jan Corbo. His father was a school administrator, and his stepmother, Molly Clark, is a doctor. Simmons was an only child and grew up in Marlborough and Brookline, Massachusetts, before moving to Stamford, Connecticut, to live with his mother after his parents divorced when he was 13. He attended the Greenwich Country Day School and then Brunswick School in Greenwich, Connecticut, for high school. In 1988, he completed a postgraduate year at Choate Rosemary Hall, a prep school located in Wallingford, Connecticut. As a child Simmons read David Halberstam's book The Breaks of the Game, which he credited as the single most formative development in his sportswriting career.

While attending the College of the Holy Cross Simmons wrote a column for the school paper, The Crusader, called "Ramblings" and later served as the paper's sports editor. He also restarted the school's parody newspaper and started a 12-14-page, underground, handwritten magazine about the people in his freshman hall called "The Velvet Edge." He graduated in 1992 with a B.A. in political science (his primary focus was the Middle East, which he often cites in his columns by way of saying his sportswriting career has nothing to do with his degree) and a GPA of 3.04. Subsequently, while living in Brookline, Massachusetts, he studied at Boston University, where he received his master's degree in print journalism two years later.

Career

Origins
For eight years following grad school, Simmons lived in Charlestown working various jobs before eventually landing a job at ESPN. The September after grad school, Simmons started working at the Boston Herald as a high school sports reporter and editorial assistant, mainly "answering phones... organizing food runs, [and] working on the Sunday football scores section." Three years later he got a job as a freelancer for Boston Phoenix but was broke within three months and started bartending. In 1997, unable to get a newspaper job, Simmons "badgered" Digital City Boston of AOL into giving him a column, and he started the web site BostonSportsGuy.com while working as a bartender and waiter at night. He decided to call his column "Sports Guy" since the site had a "Movie Guy."

Originally the column was only available on AOL, and Simmons forwarded the column to his friends. He began receiving e-mails from people asking if they could be put on his mailing list. For the first 18 months, Simmons would send it to about 100 people, until it became available on the web in November 1998. The website quickly built up a reputation as many of Simmons' friends from high school and college were e-mailing it to each other. In 2001, his website averaged 10,000 readers and 45,000 hits per day.

Jimmy Kimmel Live!
In the summer of 2002, Jimmy Kimmel had been trying to get Simmons to write for his new late-night talk show, Jimmy Kimmel Live! which was to premiere after the Super Bowl. Simmons refused for most of the summer because he did not want to cut back on his columns and move to the West Coast away from his family and Boston teams. Kimmel kept on "badgering" him and by mid-September Kimmel had him "on the ropes." It was crucial for Simmons that he could write for the show and on ESPN.com and in ESPN The Magazine, which was possible because of the Disney connection with ESPN and ABC. He has also stated that he joined the show because he was burned out from his column, felt he needed a change, and always wanted to write for a talk show.

Simmons left Boston and moved to California on November 16, 2002 and began working in April 2003 as a comedy writer for the show. Simmons called it "the best move I ever made" and said it was one of the best experiences of his life. He left the show in the spring of 2004 after a year and a half of writing for the show. He wanted to focus full-time on his column, since his writing was starting to slip and he did not have enough time to work on columns or even think about them. Simmons remained in California.

ESPN
Simmons gained fame as "The Boston Sports Guy" which earned him a job offer from ESPN in 2001 to write three guest columns. His second column was "Is Clemens the Antichrist?" which became one of the most e-mailed articles on the site that year. Becoming one of the most popular columnists on the site, Simmons was given his own section of ESPN.com's Page 2, which helped both himself and Page 2 gain widespread popularity. In the first sixteen months which Simmons wrote for Page 2 the viewership doubled. In late 2004 ESPN launched an online cartoon based on his columns which Simmons later called a "debacle" and decided to stop. Simmons wrote a column per month for his page titled "Sports Guy's World."

As a lead columnist, Simmons was one of the country's most widely read sports writers and is considered a pioneer of sportswriting on the Internet. His readership grew steadily over the following years. In 2005, according to ESPN, Simmons' column averaged 500,000 unique visitors a month. According to comScore, Simmons' column had averaged 1.4 million pageviews and 460,000 unique visitors a month between June and November 2009.

In 2007, Simmons and Connor Schell conceived the idea for 30 for 30, a series of 30 documentaries commemorating the 30th year of the "ESPN era." Simmons and Schell took special interest to "stories that resonated at the time but were eventually forgotten for whatever reason." The series premiered on October 6, 2009, with "King's Ransom" directed by Peter Berg. Simmons served as executive producer on the project until he left ESPN in 2015.

On May 8, 2007, Simmons began a podcast for ESPN.com called Eye of the Sportsguy. On June 14, 2007, the podcast was changed to The B.S. Report with a new theme song written by Ronald Jenkees. Simmons created one or two hourlong podcasts a week, generally carrying one theme throughout, talking to everyone from sports and media notables to his friends. The B.S. Report was regularly the most downloaded podcast on ESPN.com averaging 2 million downloads a month. In 2009, The B.S. Report was downloaded more than 25.4 million times.

Simmons began writing a bi-weekly 800-word column for ESPN The Magazine in 2002 but convinced ESPN after three years to give him 1,200 words. On July 27, 2009, Simmons announced his retirement from the magazine but continued to write for the Page 2 website.

In October 2007, it was announced that Simmons joined the television series E:60 as a special contributor. In May 2010, it was reported that Simmons and ESPN came to an agreement on a new contract, although no official announcement was made on the terms.

Since 2009, Simmons has also been a moderator and panelist at the annual MIT Sloan Sports Analytics Conference Starting in the 2012-2013 NBA season, Simmons joined the NBA Countdown pregame show as a panelist/contributor during ESPN/ABC's coverage of the NBA. He left the show prior to the 2014–2015 season.
 
ESPN announced on May 8, 2015, that Simmons' contract, which was due to expire in September 2015, would not be renewed.

Grantland
Simmons served as the editor-in-chief of Grantland, a website owned by ESPN covering sports and pop culture that launched on June 8, 2011. The website's name was a reference to deceased sportswriter Grantland Rice, though it was reportedly not Simmons' choice for the name. Sports blog Deadspin had previously reported in 2010 that Simmons was working on a "top secret editorial project." Some key contributors to the website included Jalen Rose, Zach Lowe, Kirk Goldsberry and Wesley Morris. In August 2014, ESPN announced that Simmons would be leaving NBA Countdown in order to produce an 18 episode primetime show for ESPN through his site called The Grantland Basketball Show-later changed to The Grantland Basketball Hour-which would debut on October 21, 2014. In these episodes, Simmons discussed NBA-related current events as well as some of his more popular sports columns with his co-host Jalen Rose. Special guests included fellow journalists, pop culture celebrities, as well as current and former coaches and athletes. Months after it decided not to renew its contract with Simmons, ESPN shut down the Grantland website on October 30, 2015.

HBO
On July 22, 2015, Simmons announced he had signed a new multi-platform deal with HBO starting in October 2015. As part of this deal, he would host a weekly talk show, Any Given Wednesday. The show premiered on June 22, 2016. It was cancelled in November 2016. Simmons's multimedia deal with the network continued, and he announced there were plans for future projects at HBO. A documentary on André the Giant was co-produced by HBO Sports, the WWE and the Bill Simmons Media Group, with Jason Hehir directing. The documentary aired on HBO on April 10, 2018.

In late July 2018 it was revealed that HBO decided to renew Simmons's contract to remain with the network moving forward.

The Ringer
Simmons announced the launch of his new website, The Ringer, on February 17, 2016. The site was to be run as part of his venture, the Bill Simmons Media Group, that was launched in the fall of 2015. The media group includes several podcasts focusing on different aspects of sports, pop culture, and technology today, and features writers on The Ringer website as hosts of these podcasts. The website also hired a number of staffers who formerly worked with Simmons at Grantland. The Ringer went live on June 1, 2016.

On May 30, 2017, Vox Media announced that it had entered into a deal to provide advertising sales and access to its publishing platform as part of a revenue sharing agreement. Simmons retained editorial control of the website. On February 5, 2020, Simmons announced that Spotify was buying The Ringer for approximately $200 million, with Daniel Ek describing The Ringer as "the new ESPN." Simmons stated that The Ringer will maintain content and editorial independence.

At The Ringer, Simmons serves as CEO, writing less than during his previous endeavors. He hosts The Bill Simmons Podcast which regularly rotates through conversations and interviews with Hollywood personalities, professional athletes, other media pundits, old friends, and family. Regulars include his college roommate Joe House, Sal Iacono, Ryen Russillo, Chuck Klosterman, David Chang, and Simmons' father.

In June 2020, Simmons received criticism for the lack of racial diversity in The Ringer following email comments he made to The New York Times, particularly that: "It's a business. This isn't Open Mic Night." Critics noted that Simmons employed his nephew as a producer and had created a podcast for his teenage daughter.

Writing
On October 1, 2005, Simmons released his first New York Times best-selling book, Now I Can Die in Peace. The book is a collection of his columns, with minor changes and lengthy footnotes, leading up to the 2004 World Series victory by the Boston Red Sox. The book spent five weeks on The New York Times extended best-seller list.

In July 2008, Simmons announced that he would be taking 10 weeks off from writing columns for ESPN.com's Page 2 to concentrate on finishing his second book, The Book of Basketball: The NBA According to the Sports Guy, which was released on October 27, 2009. The book tries to find out who really are the best players and teams of all time and the answers to some of the greatest "What ifs?" in NBA history. It debuted at the top of The New York Times Best Seller list for non-fiction books.

Style
When Simmons first started his website, he wrote what he thought friends would enjoy reading because he never understood how people could be sportswriters while claiming they did not care which team won, in the name of journalistic objectivity. Since Simmons was writing on the web he figured that "in order to get people to read it, it had to be different from what people got in newspapers and magazines." He claims that he believed his job was not to get into the heads of the players, but into the heads of his readers, and to do so by updating frequently and being provocative, and get a discussion going with his readers. Simmons has stated that he "...will never write a traditional sports column."

With his column, Simmons aims to speak for, reconnect sportswriting with, and reproduce the experience for the average fan. Simmons' writing in his columns is characterized by mixing sports knowledge, references to pop culture including movies and television shows, his non-sports-related personal life, his many fantasy sports teams, video games, and references to adult video. His columns often mention trips to Las Vegas or other gambling venues with his friends, including blackjack and sports gambling.

In 2007, he was named the 12th-most influential person in online sports by the Sports Business Journal, the highest position on the list for a non-executive.

Controversy
A frequent column target for Simmons in the past has been former New York Knicks coach and general manager Isiah Thomas. This led to Thomas threatening Simmons on Stephen A. Smith's radio show in early 2006, saying that there would be "trouble" if they ever met in the street. Upon a meeting in Las Vegas, they both decided they were entertainers at heart. Simmons and Red Sox announcer Jerry Remy feuded over the presidency of Red Sox Nation. The Red Sox asked Simmons to run for the ceremonial position and he accepted. In a candidate's memo, Simmons remarked that he was a better choice than Remy because he is not a smoker. Remy criticized Simmons for about five minutes during the July 16, 2007 NESN broadcast of a Red Sox - Royals game. Simmons later removed himself from consideration and Remy was named president.

In September 2017, Simmons voiced his support for Jemele Hill, who became involved in controversy after tweeting her personal views on Donald Trump.

On September 1, 2021, The New York Times published an investigation into The Ringer′s workplace culture. It included accusations that Simmons had tried to marginalize The Ringer′s newly-formed union, through tactics such as bringing in contract workers and unfollowing writers on Twitter who had expressed support for the union.

On April 26 2022, Simmons drew criticism from current and former NBA players over his comment stating "...fuck Jalen Green" when discussing his choices for All-Rookie first team.  Simmons later clarified that the expletive was a joke and not a personal attack, and that he was simply indicating his preference for Herb Jones as a candidate for the All-Rookie team. On May 24, 2022, Simmons hosted Jalen Green as a guest on his podcast, where the two discussed the controversy and cleared the air.

Conflicts with ESPN
Simmons has, at times, had a tense and public battle with ESPN about creative freedom and censorship. In May 2008, Simmons was embroiled in a dispute with management at ESPN.com. When asked by the editors of Deadspin why he had not written a new column in over two weeks, he said that he was writing less because he loved writing his column and believed that he and ESPN had come to an agreement "on creative lines, media criticism rules, the promotion of the column and everything else on ESPN.com" but within a few months all of those things changed.

A month before the feud erupted, Simmons was scheduled to interview then-senator Barack Obama for a podcast. Obama was still running against then-senator Hillary Clinton for the Democratic nomination at the time. ESPN nixed the interview, saying that they would allow its reporters and columnists to interview a presidential candidate only after the nomination had been finalized.

In November 2008, according to Deadspin, Simmons had quit the B.S. Report due to the content being edited out of them. The controversy revolved around the entry of pornstar Christian into an ESPN fantasy basketball league. Simmons was upset that his explanation of ESPN's refusal to allow him into the league was edited out of a podcast. On November 25, 2008, Simmons returned to recording his B.S. Report podcast with a disclaimer, which said "The BS Report is a free flowing conversation that occasionally touches on mature subjects."

In late 2009, Simmons was punished by ESPN for writing tweets critical of Boston sports radio station WEEI's The Big Show. He was suspended for two weeks from Twitter, though he was still allowed to post tweets about his ongoing book tour. ESPN again suspended him from Twitter in March 2013 after he posted tweets critical of ESPN's First Take.

On September 24, 2014, ESPN suspended Simmons for three weeks for criticizing NFL commissioner Roger Goodell's handling of the Ray Rice domestic violence case. During his podcast, Simmons stated that Goodell was lying when he claimed that he did not know what was on the tape that showed Rice punching his fiancé in the face and knocking her out in a hotel elevator.

On May 8, 2015, ESPN president John Skipper announced that the sports media conglomerate would not be renewing Simmons's contract, which was set to expire in September 2015. On May 15, it was announced Simmons was officially done at ESPN, effective immediately.

Personal life
Simmons is married to Kari Simmons (née Crichton), mentioned only as "The Sports Gal" in his columns. They have two children together, daughter Zoe Simmons (born 2005) and son Benjamin Oakley Simmons (born 2007). His father, William Simmons (born 1947), also referred to as "The Sports Dad", was the superintendent of schools in Easton, Massachusetts, for more than 15 years.

Simmons is a devoted fan of Boston's teams including the Boston Red Sox, New England Patriots, and Boston Celtics. He was a longtime fan of the Boston Bruins and the NHL, but claims that their poor management led to his completely losing interest in them until the 2008 playoffs. He also says he is a fan of English Premier League soccer team Tottenham Hotspur, and he has had playful debates on soccer with previous ESPN colleague David Hirshey, a soccer columnist and a die-hard fan of Tottenham's fierce rival Arsenal.

Simmons and his family established the Simmons Family Foundation. They made a scholarship gift to Northwestern University's Medill School of Journalism to support HBCU graduates.

Influence
Simmons also has created numerous internet memes, most notably the Ewing Theory (though the idea was originally proposed by a reader), The Tyson Zone and the Manning Face.

References

Further reading

 Lacey Rose, "Bill Simmons Breaks Free: His "F-ing Shitty" ESPN Exit, Who Courted Him and Details of His HBO Show," The Hollywood Reporter, June 8, 2016.

External links

 Sports Guy Unplugged
 Sports Guy's World
 
 Grantland

American sports radio personalities
Writers from Los Angeles
Brunswick School alumni
Writers from Brookline, Massachusetts
College of the Holy Cross alumni
Boston University College of Communication alumni
ESPN.com
Radio programs on XM Satellite Radio
1969 births
Living people
American podcasters
National Basketball Association broadcasters
Writers from Boston
21st-century American non-fiction writers
Sportswriters from Massachusetts
Shorty Award winners
Sportspeople from Brookline, Massachusetts
American writers of Italian descent